The Ministry of Equality is a department of the Government of Spain responsible for the proposal and execution of the government's policy on equality, with a focus on making the equality between men and women real and effective as well as prevention and eradication of different forms of violence against women. The department's roles also include eradication of all kind of discrimination by sex, racial and ethnic origin, religion or ideology, sexual orientation, gender identity, age, disability or any other personal or social condition or circumstances. It existed from 2008 to 2010 when it merged with the Ministry of Health, and then from 2020.

History 
The department was created in 2008 at the second term of José Luis Rodríguez Zapatero's second term in order to promote equality policies set forth in the 2007 Equality Act and in the 2004 Comprehensive Act on Violence against Women, as well as promoting the programs of the Institute of Women and the Institute of Youth. The Ministry assumed the powers on equality that belonged at that time to the Ministry of Labour and Social Affairs, which was renamed Ministry of Labour and Immigration.

The Prime Minister chose Bibiana Aído to head this new department. She became the first person to hold this position in Spain and the youngest person to hold a ministerial office in democracy.

On 21 October 2010, a cabinet reshuffle merged the Ministry of Equality in the Ministry of Health (which was headed by Leire Pajín) and in exchange the Secretariat of State for Equality was created. Aído accepted the offer of the prime minister to continue at the forefront of the equality policies as Secretary of State.

The department was reestablished on 13 January 2020.

Organization chart and key people

Current structure (2020–) 
The current structure of the Department is:

 The Secretariat of State for Equality and against Gender Violence.
 The Government Delegation against Gender Violence.
 The Directorate-General for Equal Treatment and Racial-Ethnic Diversity.
 The Directorate-General for Sexual Diversity and LGTBI Rights.
 The Undersecretariat of Equality.
 The General Technical Secretariat.

2008–2010 structure 
The Department of Equality, in its first period, was integrated by two main bodies:

 The Undersecretariat of Equality, charged with running the department on a day-to-day basis. Headed by Concepción Toquero Plaza (April–October 2008) and Antonio José Hidalgo López (2008–2010).
 The General Technical Secretariat.
 The Deputy Directorate-General for Economic, Budgetary and Personnel Programming and Management.
 The General Secretariat for Equality Policies, which was the main body in charge of developing the Ministry's powers. Headed by Isabel María Martínez Lozano (2008–2010).
 The Government Delegation for Gender Violence.
 The Directorate-General for Equality in Employment.
 The Directorate-General against Discrimination.

The department also managed the following agencies and bodies:

 The Institute of Youth.
 The Youth Council of Spain.
 The Institute of Women.
 The Women's Participation Council.
 The Council for Equal Treatment and Non-Discrimination of Persons by Racial or Ethnic Origin

List of officeholders
Office name:
Ministry of Equality (2008–2010; 2020–present)

Notes

References

External links

 Ministry of Equality 

Government ministries of Spain
Gender equality ministries